Akyemansa District is one of the thirty-three districts in Eastern Region, Ghana. Originally it was formerly part of the then-larger Birim North District in 1988, which was created from the former Birim District Council, until the southern part of the district was split off to create Akyemansa District on 29 February 2008; thus the remaining part has been retained as Birim North District. The district assembly is located in the southwest part of Eastern Region and has Ofoase as its capital town.

List of settlements

Sources
 
 Districts: Akyemansa District

References

Districts of the Eastern Region (Ghana)